Bethen is a small town on the edge of the German city Cloppenburg in Lower Saxony. It is a Marian shrine, as such first mentioned in 1448.

Cloppenburg (district)